Dracula radiosa is a species of orchid endemic to Colombia.

radiosa